Ove Skåra (born 9 March 1961) is a Norwegian civil servant.

Skåra is the current director of information in the Norwegian Data Inspectorate. When long-time director Georg Apenes stepped down in April 2010, Skåra was acting director. He made his mark while in office; among others the Data Inspectorate, together with other organizations, boycotted a sitdown arranged by the Norwegian Ministry of Justice and the Police where the Data Retention Directive was to be debated. Skåra reverted to being information director when Bjørn Erik Thon was named as permanent director in late May 2010. Skåra was not among those who applied for the position.

Skåra resides in Bærum.

References

1961 births
Living people
Directors of government agencies of Norway